Mukhbiir is a 2008 Indian Hindi-language spy thriller film directed by the Mani Shankar. The film revolves around the life and events surrounding an Indian spy. The film stars actor Sameer Dattani as the spy, and Om Puri, Sunil Shetty, Sushant Singh, Rahul Dev, Jackie Shroff and Raima Sen play the supporting roles.

Cast

 Sunil Shetty as Rehman
 Raima Sen as Roshni
 Sameer Dattani as Kailash / Vinayak D. Marathe / Shahzad Khan
 Om Puri as S.P. Rathod
 Rahul Dev as Saaya
 Sushant Singh as Pasha
 Jackie Shroff as Home Minister
 Alok Nath as Mammu
 Vinay Varma as Ismil
 Kelly Dorji as Captain Dorji
 Rajendranath Zutshi as Biju
 Supriya Karnik as Bharati Rathod 
 Beneka as Didi
 Ali Reza as Saaya's henchmen

Production
Director Mani Shankar had a story in mind in 1996 itself when he was shooting an anti-militancy music video for the Intelligence Bureau. It was during this time that he met a young Intelligence Bureau recruit who was badly tortured in militant captivity. The young man was left unaided by the Indian government thereafter as he offered them no utility. This rendezvous with the stark reality of their lives inspired Mani Shankar into the story for this film. Mani Shankar was once asked in an interview on why his previous films such as Rudraksh spent too much on research and very little on character emotions. He replied in affirmative and said that he strived to blend both of them well in this film. Since the subject of the film revolved around espionage, Mani Shankar resorted to intense research to avoid any unverifiable instances in his film. He worked closely with the Indian espionage service and utilised information for the film. Producer Sudhish Rambottla selected Mani Shankar's script after reviewing 40 of them.

Director Mani Shankar felt that actor Sameer Dattani will not comprehend fear and hence not emote well while filming. To overcome this, Mani Shankar insisted that Dattani spend a night in a prison. Only the local inspector knew him to be an actor. Besides conducting several training workshops for Dattani to prepare for his character, Mani Shankar also organized a visit to the underworld. Though he had a harrowing experience during the night, he was happy that his efforts brought him praise from the critics.

Soundtrack
The music was composed by Pritam Chakraborty, Sandeep Chowta, Shashi Preetam and Karthik Raja and released by Sony Music India. All lyrics were penned by P. K. Mishra.

Release and reception
Prior to its release, director Mani Shankar claimed that he was able to help the producer recover the budget costs. He hypothesized that the revenue from television, home video rights along with the soundtrack is usually more than the cost of the production. Since Mani Shankar claimed "pre-release profit" for this film due to intelligent budgeting, he was confident even before the film's release.

The film released on 29 August 2008 across India. The film's release coincided with the release of six other movies – Hijack, Chamku, C Kkompany, Rock On!!, Wanted and WALL-E. Usually Indian film distributors don't expect much from the films which are released during the Ramadan season. Citing them as "gap fillers" and average films, the distributors didn't foresee much revenue for this film and for those released during this season. On the contrary, Mani Shankar said that they tried for the film to release during the holy month of Ramadan. This was because it had relevance to film's story that had the protagonist getting converted to Islam. Actor Dattani was not quite worried about the audience' expectations, but instead he was worried about his expectations from the film.

In the first week of its release, the film garnered . Producer Rambottla was so impressed with the efforts of actor Dattani and director Mani Shankar, that he declared a unique money-back offer to audiences. As per this, he was prepared to offer a ticket refund to 5,000 viewers across India if they did not like the film.

Though film critic Taran Adarsh liked the idea of the film, he found it similar to Ram Gopal Varma's Contract. Despite various cinematic sequences which he found to be well written and enacted, Adarsh found the climax to be totally completely unnatural. Terming it as a film that "could've been a riveting experience, but it fails to register an impact."

References

External links
 

2008 films
2000s Hindi-language films
Films featuring songs by Pritam
2000s spy thriller films
Indian spy thriller films
Indian thriller drama films
Films scored by Karthik Raja
Films directed by Mani Shankar